Addis v Gramophone Co Ltd [1909] AC 488 is an old English contract law and UK labour law case, which used to restrict damages for non-pecuniary losses for breach of contract.

Facts
Mr Addis was Gramophone’s manager in Calcutta. In October 1905, he was given six months' notice of dismissal as legally required and a successor was appointed. However, Gramophone also immediately took steps during this six-month period to prevent Addis acting as manager, resulting in Addis leaving his job two months later and returning to England. This was humiliating. The jury awarded Addis £340 for loss of commissions and £600 for wrongful dismissal. Could there be damages for the manner of dismissal?

The Court of Appeal had allowed damages for the manner of the dismissal.

Submissions
Duke KC and Groser, for the appellant.

Lush KC (Schiller with him), for the respondents.

Judgment
Lord Loreburn held that £600 was not allowed, that he could only recover his six-month salary and no more. At 491 he said,

‘If there be a dismissal without notice the employer must pay an indemnity; but that indemnity cannot include compensation either for the injured feelings of the servant…’

Lord Collins dissented.
Lord Atkinson said the case was in fact about libel.

Lord Loreburn LC

Lord James of Hereford.

Lord Atkinson.

Lord Collins.

Lord Gorell.

Lord Shaw of Dunfermline.

Significance
The case was met with immediate disapproval in a number of quarters. Sir Frederick Pollock, contrasted "an artificial rule or mere authority" to "the rationale of the matter":

In 1997, Lord Steyn explained the current jurisprudence relating to the ratio of Addis in his judgment in Malik v Bank of Credit and Commerce International SA:

In 2001, Farley v Skinner further distinguished Addis, in holding that "the plaintiff's claim is not for injured feelings caused by the breach of contract. Rather it is a claim for damages flowing from the surveyor's failure to investigate and report, thereby depriving the buyer of the chance of making an informed choice whether or not to buy resulting in mental distress and disappointment."

See also
Contract law cases
Jarvis v Swans Tours Ltd [1973] 1 All ER 71
Jackson v Horizon Holidays Ltd [1975] 3 All ER 92
Ruxley Electronics Ltd v Forsyth [1995] UKHL 8
Farley v Skinner [2000] UKHL 49
Johnson v Gore Wood & Co [2002] 2 AC 1, 49, (a case actually concerning "reflective loss" in UK company law) it was said contract breaking is an ‘incident of commercial life which players in the game are expected to meet with mental fortitude’

Labour law cases
Malik and Mahmud v Bank of Credit and Commerce International SA [1997] UKHL 23, [1998] AC 20; [1997] 3 All ER 1, [1997] IRLR 462, [1997] 3 WLR 95, [1997] ICR 606 
Johnson v Unisys Ltd [1998] EWCA Civ 1913, [2001] UKHL 13
Eastwood v Magnox Electric plc [2002] EWCA Civ 463

Further reading

References

United Kingdom labour case law
English remedy case law
House of Lords cases
1909 in British law
1909 in case law